Camas: The Nature of the West is a non-profit literary journal run by graduate students of the Environmental Studies Program at the University of Montana. Established in 1992, Camas publishes non-fiction, fiction, poetry and photography on nature, place, and culture of the American West. The magazine produces two issues per year.

Recognition
Camas has been recognized in national magazines such as Utne Reader and High Country News for its unique mixture of personal essays, photos, and poetry related to life in the west with its cohabitation of people and wildlife.  The magazine was also recognized by the travel magazine Matador Network as the #7 "Magazines, Journals, and Blogs Every Travel Writer Should Know About" in 2009.

Contributors
An array of both established and emerging authors and photographers have contributed to Camas. The following is a list of notable writers who have appeared in the journal:
Rick Bass
Wendell Berry
Judy Blunt
Ron Carlson
Craig Childs
David James Duncan
Derrick Jensen
William Kittredge
Ellen Meloy
 Richard Nelson
Robert Michael Pyle
Janisse Ray
Chip Rawlins
Annick Smith
Rebecca Solnit
Kim Stafford

References

Biannual magazines published in the United States
Environmental magazines
Magazines established in 1992
Magazines published in Montana
Mass media in Missoula, Montana
Publications of the University of Montana
Student magazines published in the United States